Marco Segatel (born 23 March 1962) is an Italian male high jumper masters athlete.

Biography
Segatel is current holder of the master's world record of the high jump M55. He won five gold medals in six different editions (from 2003 to 2018) at the World Masters Athletics Championships.

Records

World record
High jump M55: 1.91 m,  Orvieto, 8 July 2017 - current holder.

European record
High jump M45: 2.04 m,  Cernusco sul Naviglio, 19 July 2007 - current holder.
High jump M55: 1.87 m,  Madrid, 21 March 2018 - current holder.

See also
 List of world records in masters athletics
 List of European records in masters athletics

References

External links
Marco Segatel profile at All-Athletics

1962 births
Living people
Italian male high jumpers
Italian masters athletes
World record holders in masters athletics